Markus Speiser (born 5 March 1985) is an Austrian footballer who played in the First League for clubs including SKN St. Pölten and First Vienna.

References

1985 births
Living people
Association football defenders
Austrian footballers
SKN St. Pölten players
First Vienna FC players